Mitchell Thomas Spencer (born 8 March 1993) is an English cricketer. He made his List A debut for Worcestershire against the West Indies A in a tri-series warm-up match on 19 June 2018.

References

External links
 

1993 births
Living people
Cricketers from Stoke-on-Trent
English cricketers
Worcestershire cricketers
Staffordshire cricketers